"The More You Ignore Me, the Closer I Get" is a song by English singer-songwriter Morrissey, co-written by Boz Boorer released as a single on 28 February 1994. It was taken from the then-unreleased Vauxhall and I album and was the first Morrissey single to be produced by Steve Lillywhite. The extra B-side "I'd Love To" features Kirsty MacColl on backing vocals.

Reaching number eight on the UK Singles Chart, the single became Morrissey's first top-ten hit since "Interesting Drug" in 1989. It is also Morrissey's only charting single on the US Billboard Hot 100, reaching number 46, and it became his second and most recent Modern Rock Tracks number-one hit. The song also reached the top 50 in Canada, France and Ireland. It was most successful in Iceland, where it reached number two for three weeks.

Versions
The US and UK single releases each contained slightly different mixes of the track. Both mixes use the same take of the song, but the US version featuring less guitars, is three seconds shorter and includes additional synthesized sound effects (a percussive, glassy sound) throughout the song. The same synth effects are barely audible in the UK mix and in sections are completely absent. The US version of "I'd Love To" later appeared on the 1998 US compilation My Early Burglary Years. The UK version was included on the track listing on the 1997 CD reissue of Viva Hate, despite not being a contemporaneous recording from those sessions.

Critical reception
NME gave the single a negative review, describing the song as a "formless neutered ramble" and that his "gleaming reputation tarnishes" with this release.

Ned Raggett of AllMusic said that initially the title track " a bit clumsy, with slightly repetitious lyrics and a bit of lazy feeling to it", but it was ultimately "another Morrissey classic, with good production from Steve Lillywhite and a low-key but confident performance from the band."  The B-side "Used to Be a Sweet Boy" was "more immediately affecting", and non-album track "I'd Like To" [sic]  had a "mysterious, spacious band performance."

Live performances

The song was performed live by Morrissey on his 1995, 1999–2000 and 2004 tours.

Track listings
7-inch vinyl and cassette
 "The More You Ignore Me, the Closer I Get"
 "Used to Be a Sweet Boy"

12-inch vinyl and CD (UK)
 "The More You Ignore Me, the Closer I Get"
 "Used to Be a Sweet Boy"
 "I'd Love To" (UK version)

CD (US)
 "The More You Ignore Me, the Closer I Get"
 "Used to Be a Sweet Boy"
 "I'd Love To" (USA version)

Personnel
 Morrissey - vocals
 Alain Whyte - guitar
 Boz Boorer - guitar
 Jonny Bridgwood - bass guitar
 Woodie Taylor - drums

Charts

Weekly charts

Year-end charts

See also
 Morrissey discography

References

Morrissey songs
1994 singles
1993 songs
Songs written by Morrissey
Songs written by Boz Boorer
Song recordings produced by Steve Lillywhite
Parlophone singles
Works about stalking
Music videos directed by Mark Romanek